Valyl-tRNA synthetase 2, mitochondrial is a protein that in humans is encoded by the VARS2 gene.

Function

This gene encodes a mitochondrial aminoacyl-tRNA synthetase, which catalyzes the attachment of valine to tRNA(Val) for mitochondrial translation. Mutations in this gene cause combined oxidative phosphorylation deficiency-20, and are also associated with early-onset mitochondrial encephalopathies. Alternative splicing of this gene results in multiple transcript variants. [provided by RefSeq, Aug 2014].

References

Further reading